Walla Lutheran Church is a historic church in rural Roberts County, South Dakota, in the United States.It was added to the National Register of Historic Places in 2004.

Walla Lutheran Church was organized in 1894 by Swedish immigrant homesteaders as the Swedish Evangelical Lutheran Walla Church. Built in 1902, the sanctuary is a large wood-frame church with Late Gothic Revival features.  The church was dedicated in 1903. Pastor K. G. William Dahl, who later founded Bethphage Mission in Axtell, Nebraska served the church from 1907 to 1909.

References

External links
Walla Lutheran Church photograph

Lutheran churches in South Dakota
Churches on the National Register of Historic Places in South Dakota
Gothic Revival church buildings in South Dakota
Churches completed in 1902
Buildings and structures in Roberts County, South Dakota
National Register of Historic Places in Roberts County, South Dakota